Michael Stevens or Mike Stevens may refer to:

Entertainment

Music
Michael Stevens (composer), American jazz composer and musician
Michael Jefry Stevens (born 1951), American jazz pianist
Mike Stevens (bluegrass harmonica), Canadian harmonica virtuoso
Mike Stevens (saxophonist) (born 1957), British musician and musical director
Mick Stevens (musician) (1953–1987), English guitarist, singer, and songwriter
Meic Stevens (born 1942), Welsh singer-songwriter

Other entertainment
Michael Fenton Stevens (born 1958), British actor and comedian
Michael Stevens (producer) (1966–2015), American television producer, director, and writer
Mike Stevens (Brookside), fictional character

Politics
Mike Stevens (Ohio politician), member of the Ohio House of Representatives
Mike Stevens (South Dakota politician) (born 1953), Republican member of the South Dakota House of Representatives

Sports
Mike Stevens (ice hockey, born 1950), ice hockey player who played in the World Hockey Association
Mike Stevens (ice hockey, born 1965), ice hockey player who played in the National Hockey League
Michael Stevens (footballer) (born 1980), former Australian rules footballer

Others
Michael D. Stevens (born 1964), Master Chief Petty Officer of the U.S. Navy
Michael Stevens (educator) (born 1986), host of the YouTube channel Vsauce
Sir Michael Stevens (accountant), British accountant and courtier

See also
Michael Stephens (disambiguation)